Wolf Witzemann (1924–1991) was an Austrian art director. He designed sets for a number of films and television productions.

Selected filmography
 The Last Bridge (1954)
 The Last Ten Days (1955)
 Mozart (1955)
 Forest Liesel (1956)
 Imperial and Royal Field Marshal (1956)
 Engagement at Wolfgangsee (1956)
 War of the Maidens (1957)
 Dort in der Wachau (1957)
 Candidates for Marriage (1958)
 Sebastian Kneipp (1958)
 My Daughter Patricia (1959)
 Final Accord (1960)
 Frauen in Teufels Hand (1960)
 Napoleon II, the Eagle (1961)
 The Elusive Corporal (1962)
 Our Crazy Nieces (1963)
 Don't Fool with Me (1963)
 Dog Eat Dog (1964)
 Shameless (1968)
 Die Abenteuer des braven Soldaten Schwejk (1972, TV series)

References

Bibliography
 Silberman, Marc. German Cinema: Texts in Context. Wayne State University Press, 1995.

External links

1924 births
1991 deaths
Austrian art directors